William Marion Jardine (January 16, 1879January 17, 1955) was a U.S. administrator and educator. He served as the United States Secretary of Agriculture from 1925 to 1929 and as the U.S. Minister to Egypt from 1930 to 1933.

Early life and education
Jardine was born in Oneida County, Idaho, to Rebecca and William Jardine.  He graduated with a bachelor of science degree from Utah Agricultural College (today Utah State University) in Logan, Utah. On September 6, 1905, Jardine married the former Effie Lane Nebeker; they had three children. He attended graduate school at the University of Illinois at Urbana-Champaign in 1906.

Jardine had a strong interest in practical farming. He was also attracted to the opportunities in education.  He began his teaching in Utah, where he soon became professor of agronomy. In 1910, Jardine moved to Manhattan, Kansas, to accept the position of agronomist at the Kansas State Agricultural College. Three years later, Jardine was made dean of the Division of Agriculture and was Director of the Agriculture Experiment Station.

President of Kansas State University
On March 1, 1918, Jardine became the seventh President of Kansas State University. He served until February 28, 1925, when he was succeeded by Francis D. Farrell.  The office had been vacant after Henry J. Waters resigned to become managing editor of the Weekly Kansas City Star.

During his time in office, Jardine penned several handbooks, such as the "Suggestions for Teachers Giving Practical Instruction to City Boys in (a) Care and Handling of Work Horses (b) Care, Adjustment, and Use of Farm Machinery (c) Care and Handling of Dairy Cows and Milk", which was published by the Kansas State Council of Defense.

Jardine achieved an outstanding reputation for his work in agricultural education that extended far beyond the borders of the state of Kansas.

Secretary of Agriculture

On March 5, 1925, President Calvin Coolidge appointed him United States Secretary of Agriculture, a position he held for the next four years.

United States Minister to Egypt 
At the end of the Coolidge administration on March 4, 1929, Jardine served in President Herbert Hoover's administration as the United States Minister to Egypt from October 13, 1930, until September 5, 1933.

President of Municipal University of Wichita
After returning to Kansas in 1933, Jardine became the president of the Municipal University of Wichita (currently known as Wichita State University). Jardine was appointed by the Kansas State Treasurer from October 2, 1933, and he took the oath the following day.  He served in this capacity from October 3, 1933, until 1949.

Death

Jardine was very active in education and government services until his death on January 17, 1955, in San Antonio, Texas. He is interred at the Logan City Cemetery in Logan, Utah.

Jardine was a Congregationalist and was a member of a Freemasons, Rotary, Alpha Zeta, Beta Theta Pi, Phi Kappa Phi, and the Sigma Xi.

Jardine's papers are archived at Wichita State University in Kansas.

References

External links

 
William M. Jardine, Kansas Historical Society
William M. Jardine, Transcribed from A Standard History of Kansas and Kansans, written and compiled by William E. Connelley, Secretary of the Kansas State Historical Society, Topeka. Chicago: Lewis Publishing Company, copyright 1918

1879 births
1955 deaths
American agriculturalists
Ambassadors of the United States to Egypt
Coolidge administration cabinet members
20th-century American politicians
People from Oneida County, Idaho
Presidents of Kansas State University
State treasurers of Kansas
United States Secretaries of Agriculture
University of Illinois Urbana-Champaign alumni
Utah State University alumni
Presidents of Wichita State University
Kansas Republicans
Presidents of the American Society of Agronomy